Goddess of the Fireflies is a Canadian drama film, directed by Anaïs Barbeau-Lavalette and released in 2020. An adaptation of the novel by Geneviève Pettersen, the film centres on the coming of age of Catherine (Kelly Depeault), a teenage girl living in a small town in Quebec in the early 1990s.

Cast
The cast includes Caroline Néron and Normand D'Amour as Catherine's parents, Éléonore Loiselle as her best friend Marie-Ève, and Robin L'Houmeau, Noah Parker, Antoine DesRochers and Marine Johnson as her classmates.

Production
Kelly Depeault was 17-years-old at the time of filming this movie, where she has some nude and explicit sex scenes. While director Anaïs Barbeau-Lavalette admits that the shooting went smoothly, she also admits to having worked a lot with the actors during the sex scenes, the most delicate to stage, according to her.

Release
The film premiered in February 2020 at the 70th Berlin International Film Festival in the Generation 14plus program. It was subsequently screened at the 2020 Quebec City Film Festival, where it won the Grand Prix. It premiered commercially in Canada on September 25.

Awards and nominations

References

External links

La déesse des mouches à feu at Library and Archives Canada

2020 films
2020s coming-of-age drama films
Canadian coming-of-age drama films
Films directed by Anaïs Barbeau-Lavalette
Films shot in Quebec
Films set in Quebec
Films based on Canadian novels
Best Film Prix Iris winners
French-language Canadian films
2020s Canadian films